The Toymaker is a collection of science fiction short stories by Raymond F. Jones.  It was first published in 1951 by Fantasy Publishing Company, Inc. in an edition of 1,300 copies of which 1,000 were hardback.  The stories originally appeared in the magazines Astounding and Fantastic Adventures.

Contents
 "The Model Shop"
 "Deadly Host"
 "Utility"
 "Forecast"
 "The Toymaker"
 "The Children’s Room"

Reception
Forrest J. Ackerman wrote in Astounding that "Jones' first volume is a joymaker" with a good sampling of stories.

References

1951 short story collections
Science fiction short story collections
Fantasy Publishing Company, Inc. books